Polyrhaphis argentina is a species of beetle in the family Cerambycidae. It was described by Lane in 1978. It is known from Bolivia, Argentina, Peru, and Paraguay.

References

Polyrhaphidini
Beetles described in 1978